Niu Jianfeng (born on April 3, 1981 in Baoding, Hebei) is a Chinese table tennis player who competed in the 2004 Summer Olympics.

She won the bronze medal in the women's doubles competition together with Guo Yue. In the women's singles competition she was eliminated in round 16.

References

1981 births
Living people
Olympic bronze medalists for China
Olympic table tennis players of China
Table tennis players from Baoding
Table tennis players at the 2004 Summer Olympics
Olympic medalists in table tennis
Table tennis players at the 2002 Asian Games
Asian Games medalists in table tennis
Chinese female table tennis players
Medalists at the 2004 Summer Olympics
Medalists at the 2002 Asian Games
Asian Games silver medalists for China
Universiade gold medalists for China
Universiade medalists in table tennis
Medalists at the 2001 Summer Universiade